The 37th America's Cup will be raced between a yacht representing the Royal New Zealand Yacht Squadron and a yacht representing the yacht club that wins the  Challenger Selection Series (Prada Cup). It will be held in Barcelona, Spain, in September and October 2024.

The Royal New Zealand Yacht Squadron will be the defender of the 37th America's Cup, after its yacht Te Rehutai, owned and sailed by the Emirates Team New Zealand syndicate, was the successful defender in the 36th America's Cup, beating the challenger Luna Rossa, representing Circolo della Vela Sicilia, 7-3 in a first-to-seven series raced from 10–17 March 2021 in the Waitemata Harbour and Hauraki Gulf off Auckland, New Zealand.

Immediately after Te Rehutai achieved its seventh win in the 36th America's Cup, the Chairman of Royal Yacht Squadron Racing Ltd, Bertie Bicket, issued a pre-arranged, "friendly" challenge to the Commodore of the Royal New Zealand Yacht Squadron, Aaron Young. 
 This made Royal Yacht Squadron Racing Ltd the Challenger of Record for the next America's Cup.

The Royal New Zealand Yacht Squadron was founded in 1871 as the Auckland Yacht Club and took its current name in 1902 after receiving a warrant in the name of King Edward VII. Royal Yacht Squadron Racing Ltd was founded in 2014 and is a private company limited by guarantee without share capital, registered with the UK Companies House, and associated with the UK's Royal Yacht Squadron.

History

Origins
The America's Cup is the oldest competition in international sport, and the fourth oldest continuous sporting trophy of any kind. The cup itself was manufactured in 1848 and first called the "RYS £100 Cup". It was first raced for on 22 August 1851 around the Isle of Wight off Southampton and Portsmouth in Hampshire, England, in a fleet race between the New York Yacht Club's America and 15 yachts of the Royal Yacht Squadron. The race was witnessed by Queen Victoria and the future Edward VII and won by the sailing yacht America. This is considered to be the first America's Cup race, and hence originated the cup's name.

On 8 July 1857, the surviving members of the America syndicate donated the cup to the New York Yacht Club via the Deed of Gift of the America's Cup filed with the New York Supreme Court. The deed is the primary instrument that governs the rules to make a valid challenge for the America's Cup and the rules of conduct of the races. It states that the cup "is donated upon the condition that it shall be preserved as a perpetual challenge Cup for friendly competition between foreign countries", outlines how a foreign yacht club can make a challenge to the holder of the cup and what happens if they do not agree on how the match should be conducted. The deed makes it "distinctly understood that the cup is to be the property of the club [that has most recently won a match for the cup], subject to the provisions of this deed, and not the property of the owner or owners of any vessel winning a match".

Summary of Previous Matches

As of 31 March 2021, a total of 36 cup matches had been held. The New York Yacht Club won the first 25 matches, once around the Isle of Wight, 13 times off New York City and then 11 times off Newport, Rhode Island, and established a 132-year winning record, the longest in international sport. Australia's Royal Perth Yacht Club broke this winning record on 26 September 1983 before losing the cup in 1987 in Fremantle, near Perth, in Western Australia. Since then, the cup has moved around more frequently, and has been won by the USA's San Diego Yacht Club (1987, 1988 and 1992), New Zealand's Royal New Zealand Yacht Squadron (1995, 2000, 2017 and 2021), Switzerland's Société Nautique de Genève (2003 and 2007), and the USA's Golden Gate Yacht Club (2010 and 2013).

Of the 36 cup matches, 33 have been held in the home waters of the defending club. Because Switzerland is a land-locked country, and the deed envisages racing should be held on ocean courses, Société Nautique de Genève held its 2007 and 2010 defences in Valencia, Spain. For commercial reasons, Golden Gate Yacht Club held the 2017 defence in Bermuda, losing to the Royal New Zealand Yacht Squadron. When defending the cup in home waters, the defending cup has won 85% of America's Cup matches, losing only in 1851, 1983, 1987, 1992 and 2003. When defending the cup in foreign waters, the defending cup has lost 67% of America's Cup matches, losing in 2010 and 2017.

The 36th match from 10–17 March 2021 was the Royal New Zealand Yacht Squadron's fourth America's Cup victory, following its wins in 1995, 2000 and 2017, making it the most successful club in the competition's history except for the New York Yacht Club. The 2021 win also made the Royal New Zealand Yacht Squadron the only club to have twice successfully challenged for and then defended the America's Cup.

Terms of Challenge

Background

The challenge by Royal Yacht Squadron Racing Ltd to the Royal New Zealand Yacht Squadron was made on board the 110 foot luxury sailing yacht Imagine immediately following the completion of the 10th and final race of the 36th America's Cup on 17 March 2021.

The challenge was a pre-arranged "friendly" challenge arranged by the Royal New Zealand Yacht Squadron and Royal Yacht Squadron Racing Ltd and their respective sailing teams Team New Zealand and Ineos Team UK.  The fact of the challenge and some details were made public on 19 March 2021. Both the Royal New Zealand Yacht Squadron and Royal Yacht Squadron Racing Ltd consider the challenge to be valid.

Rules for Issuing Challenge

All challenges for the America's Cup are made under the Deed of Gift of the America's Cup, which outlines who can challenge for the cup, and what information a challenge must provide to the defender. The deed then allows for most of the arrangements for the match to be made by negotiation and mutual consent, but provides a backstop in the event agreement is not reached. The first valid challenge that is made must be accepted by the defender or it must forfeit the cup to that valid challenger or negotiate other terms.

To be eligible, a challenging club must be "an organized yacht Club" of a country other than the defender, which is "incorporated, patented, or licensed by the legislature, admiralty or other executive department". The club must hold an "annual regatta [on] an ocean water course on the sea, or on an arm of the sea, or one which combines both". The New York Supreme Court and the New York Court of Appeals have held that this means the challenging club must in fact "have held at least one qualifying annual regatta before it submits its Notice of Challenge to a Defender and demonstrate that it will continue to have qualifying annual regattas on an ongoing basis" and not merely intend to hold its first annual regatta before the envisaged America's Cup match. The New York Supreme Court has also found that the Great Lakes between the United States and Canada are arms of the sea, allowing clubs with regattas on those lakes to be challengers.

The challenge document must give dates for the proposed races, which must be no less than 10 months from the date the challenge is made, and within date ranges specified for both the northern and southern hemispheres. The challenge document must also provide information on the yacht, including length on load water line; beam at load water line, and extreme beam; and draught of water. If the yacht has one mast, it must be between 44 and 90 feet on the load water line. If it has more than one mast, it must be between 80 and 115 feet on the load water line. These dimensions may not be exceeded by either challenger or defender. The yachts must be propelled by sails only and be constructed in the country to which the challenging and defending clubs belong. Centreboard or sliding keel vessels are allowed with no restrictions nor limitations, and neither the centre-board nor sliding keel is considered a part of the vessel for any purposes of measurement. As long as these rules are met, the New York Court of Appeals has ruled that defender may use a boat of a different category to the challenger, such as meeting a challenge in a monohull with a catamaran.

Under the deed, the defender and challenger "may by mutual consent make any arrangement satisfactory to both as to the dates, courses, number of trials, rules and sailing regulations, and any and all other conditions of the match, in which case also the ten months’ notice may be waived". Since 1958, the practice has usually been for the defender and challenger to agree that the challenger shall be a Challenger of Record, which then arranges a Challenger Series involving a number of other yacht clubs from countries other than that of the defender. The yacht that wins the Challenger Series wins the Herbert Pell Cup and also an associated sponsored cup such as the Prada Cup in 2021 or the Louis Vuitton Cup between 1983 and 2017. 
  
However, if the challenger and defender cannot agree, the deed provides a backstop, requiring a first-to-two match on ocean courses defined in the deed, at a venue selected by the defender, under its rules and sailing regulations so far as they do not conflict with the provisions of the deed, on the dates submitted by the challenger and in yachts meeting the terms of the deed and the challenge notice.

Terms of RYSR Ltd Challenge

The full text and terms of the challenge have not been made public, but a number of areas of agreement have been revealed in media statements by the 
Royal Yacht Squadron Racing Ltd and Royal New Zealand Yacht Squadron and their sailing teams, and in subsequent public comments. Royal Yacht Squadron Racing Ltd and Royal New Zealand Yacht Squadron say they will negotiate and issue a protocol to govern the 37th America's Cup by 19 November 2021, eight months after they revealed initial information about the challenge.

Yacht Class

It has been agreed the America's Cup 75 (AC75), a  foiling monohull class developed and used for the first time for the 36th America's Cup shall remain the class of yacht for the 37th America's Cup. Royal Yacht Squadron Racing Ltd and Royal New Zealand Yacht Squadron also intend that the AC75 class should be used for the 38th America's Cup, and say that agreement to this will be a condition of entry for any other complying clubs wishing to enter any challenger series for the 37th America's Cup.

Nationality Rules

It has been agreed a new crew nationality rule will require 100% of race crews to either be a passport holder of the country the team’s yacht club as at 19 March 2021 or to have been physically present in that country (or, acting on behalf of such a yacht club in Auckland, the venue of the 36th America’s Cup Events) for two of the previous three years prior to 18 March 2021. There will be a discretionary provision allowing a quota of non-nationals on the race crew for competitors from  "emerging nations", although this term and the size of the quota is yet to be defined.

Cost Reduction Programme

To reduce costs, it has been agreed teams will be restricted to building only one new AC75 for the 37th America's Cup. In addition, Royal Yacht Squadron Racing Ltd and Royal New Zealand Yacht Squadron have committed to "investigating and agreeing a meaningful package of campaign cost reduction measures including measures to attract a higher number of challengers and to assist with the establishment of new teams".

Venue
Royal Yacht Squadron Racing Ltd and Royal New Zealand Yacht Squadron planned to announce the venue for the 37th America's Cup by 19 September 2021. New Zealand Prime Minister Jacinda Ardern said her Government wanted to see the cup defended in Auckland in 2023, and announced the availability of Government funding to assist Team New Zealand to stay together, subject to a number of conditions, including an expectation the Cup will be defended in New Zealand. 

However, on 29 March 2022, Barcelona was announced as the host of the 2024 America's Cup.
Barcelona’s bid saw an unprecedented alliance across public and private entities working together to attract the America’s Cup to Barcelona which included the Government of Catalonia, Barcelona City Council, City Hall of Barcelona, Port of Barcelona, Barcelona Global’s investment agency and Barcelona & Partners.
Of the previous 36 cup matches, 33 have been held in the defender's home waters. The Deed of Gift provides for the defender to name the venue if they and the Challenger of Record cannot reach agreement.

Dates

The dates for the 37th America's Cup will be announced either in the event protocol to be published before 19 November 2021 or earlier. The deed requires the match to be held in summer or summer-shoulder months. If the match is held in Auckland or elsewhere in the Southern Hemisphere, it must be held between 1 November and 30 April. If it is held on The Solent or elsewhere in the Northern Hemisphere, it must be held between 1 May and 31 October.

2021
November 17, 2021: AC37 Protocol and AC75 Class Rule V2 Published
December 1, 2021: Entries for Challengers Open

2022
March 31, 2022: Defender to announce Match Venue and approximate event dates
June 17, 2022: New competitors may sail Version 1 AC75s for 20 sailing days
July 31, 2022: Entry Period Closes
September 17, 2022: Competitors may sail an AC75 Yacht
November 30, 2022: ACE to announce race schedule for the Match
November 30, 2022: ACE to announce racing area for CSS and Match
December 31, 2022: ACE to publish Brand Manual

2023
May 31, 2023: Final cut off for late Challenger entries.
June 30, 2023: ACE to publish Youth and Women’s AC Agreement
June 30, 2023: COR/D to publish Match Conditions
November 30, 2023: COR/D to publish CSS Conditions

Event Management

Royal Yacht Squadron Racing Ltd and Royal New Zealand Yacht Squadron announced a to establish a single Event Authority responsible for the conduct of all racing and the management of commercial activities relating to the 37th America's Cup. Therefore 'ACE (America’s Cup Event) Barcelona S.L.' was created as the sole Event Authority for the 37th America’s Cup in Barcelona and is exclusively responsible for the planning, management and delivery of a successful event.

Challengers 
The Royal Yacht Squadron Racing Ltd is the Challenger of Record for the 37th America's Cup. Their team, INEOS Britannia, previously lost to Emirates Team New Zealand in the 2017 Louis Vuitton Cup semi-finals, and Luna Rossa Prada Pirelli in the 2021 Prada Cup final. The Royal Yacht Squadron Racing Ltd's challenge will be the first time a British team has competed in three consecutive America's Cup cycles since 1930.

Circolo della Vela Sicilia, represented by Luna Rossa Prada Pirelli, have indicated their interest in returning for the 37th America's Cup. Luna Rossa previously lost to Emirates Team New Zealand in the 2021 America's Cup final. In a statement, the team said that they looked "forward to returning to racing on the AC75s in the next edition of the America's Cup".

The New York Yacht Club (NYYC) had indicated interest in returning for the 37th America's Cup. American Magic previously lost to Luna Rossa Prada Pirelli in the 2021 Prada Cup semi-final. The NYYC submitted a challenge to the Royal New Zealand Yacht Squadron on May 6, 2021, alongside an Evolutionary Draft Protocol for the 37th America's Cup. The Royal New Zealand Yacht Squadron released a statement in response, where they said they were "delighted to hear that the New York Yacht Club" were interested, but questioned, "their motives for such a presumptuous statement when entries [did not] open for some time." The Royal Yacht Squadron and Ineos Team UK also released a statement in response to the New York Yacht Club's challenge, stating that they were "working collaboratively with the Royal Yacht Squadron and Team New Zealand".

The NYYC has since dropped American Magic and announced a tentative partnership with Stars & Stripes.  Subsequently, the NYYC announced they would no longer pursue the 37th Americas Cup and then on 7 January the Club opted back in with American Magic.

In December 2021 Alinghi founder Ernesto Bertarelli and two-time Olympic champion Hans Peter Steinacher announced the launch of the new Alinghi Red Bull Racing challenge. Bertarelli will continue to represent the Société Nautique de Genève, the yacht club that won the 2003 Louis Vuitton Cup, the 2003 America's Cup, and the 2007 America's Cup.

On 3 January 2023, the organisers of the 37th America's Cup announced that K-Challenge Racing would challenge for the 37th America's Cup, after previously challenging for the 32nd America's Cup in 2007. Led by Stephane Kandler and Bruno Dubois, the team will represent the Société Nautique de Saint-Tropez.

Boats

References

External links 
 Americascup.com, the official website of the competition

America's Cup regattas
America's Cup
America's Cup
America's Cup
America's Cup
America's Cup